The Eparchy of Dalmatia ( or ) is a diocese or eparchy of the Serbian Orthodox Church, having jurisdiction over the region of Dalmatia, in Croatia. Since 2017, Serbian Orthodox Bishop of Dalmatia is Nikodim Kosović.

History

Early Christianity in Dalmatia

Middle Ages: Croatian and Hungarian Rule

Between Venetian and Turkish Rule

Under French and Austrian Rule

Dalmatia in Yugoslavia

Modern Times

Bishops
Nikodim Busović (1693—1705), as bishop of Krka
Savatije Ljubibratić (1705—1716)
Stevan Ljubibratić (1716–1722)
Simeon Končarević (1751—1762)
Venedikt Kraljević (1810—1823)
Josif Rajačić (1829—1834)
Pantelejmon Živković (1834— 1836)
Jerotej Mutibarić (1843—1853)
Stefan Knežević (1853—1890)
Nikodim Milaš (1890—1910)
Dimitrije Branković (1913—1920)
Danilo Pantelić (1921—1927)
Maksimilijan Hajdin (1928—1931)
Irinej Đorđević (1931—1952)
Nikanor Iličić (1947—1951)
Simeon Zloković (1951—1959)
Stefan Boca (1959—1978)
Nikolaj Mrđa (1978—1992)
Longin Krčo (1992—1999)
Fotije Sladojević (1999—2017)
Nikodim Kosović (2017—present)

Monasteries

 Dragović Monastery
 Lazarica Monastery
 Krka Monastery
 Krupa Monastery

See also

 Serbs of Croatia
 History of Dalmatia
 Eastern Orthodoxy in Croatia
 List of the Eparchies of the Serbian Orthodox Church

References

Sources

External links
 Official Site of the Eparchy
 SOC (2010): Communique of Diocese of Dalmatia regarding announcement on foundation of so-called "Croatian Orthodox Church"
 The Serbs in the Former SR of Croatia

 
Serbian Orthodox Church in Croatia
Religious sees of the Serbian Orthodox Church
Serbian minority institutions and organizations in Croatia